Bali is a town and commune in Cameroon, lying west of Bamenda.  It has a population of 32,000 (2001 estimate). Formerly the centre of a kingdom, it is known for its palace and its regular festival.

References 

Communes of Northwest Region (Cameroon)